Daviesia lancifolia is a species of flowering plant in the family Fabaceae and is endemic to the south-west of Western Australia. It is a prostrate to erect, spreading shrub with egg-shaped, more or less round or linear phyllodes and yellow to orange and red flowers.

Description

Taxonomy and naming
Daviesia lancifolia was first formally described in 1853 by Nikolai Turczaninow in the Bulletin de la Société Impériale des Naturalistes de Moscou. The specific epithet (lancifolia) means "lance-leaved".

Distribution and habitat
This species of Daviesia grows in heath and mallee shrubland between Narrogin, the Stirling Range, Hyden and the Cape Arid National Park in the Avon Wheatbelt, Esperance Plains, Jarrah Forest and Mallee biogeographic regions of south-western Western Australia.

Conservation status
Daviesia lancifolia is listed as "not threatened" by the Department of Biodiversity, Conservation and Attractions.

References

lancifolia
Eudicots of Western Australia
Plants described in 1853
Taxa named by Nikolai Turczaninow